Charles Richards may refer to:

Charles Brinckerhoff Richards (1833–1919), engineer, designer of the Colt Single action army revolver, and Yale professor
Charles Dow Richards (1879–1956), Canadian judge and New Brunswick politician
Charles L. Richards (1877–1953), American Representative from Nevada
Charles Richards (pentathlete) (born 1945), American modern pentathlete
Red Richards (1912–1998), American jazz pianist
Charles Richards (NASA engineer) (fl. 1960s), American NASA engineer, Rogallo manned kite-glider designer
Charles Foster Richards (1866–1944), stamp collector
Charles S. Richards (1878–1971), justice of the Delaware Supreme Court
Charlie Richards (1875–?), footballer
Charlie Richards (Australian footballer) (1910–1990)
Chuck Richards (1913–1984), American radio DJ

See also
Charles Richard (disambiguation)
Richards (surname)